This is a list of National Hockey League (NHL) players who have played at least one game in the NHL from 1917 to present and have a last name that starts with "B".

List updated as of the 2021-22 NHL season.

Ba

 Pete Babando
 Anton Babchuk
 Bob Babcock
 Warren Babe
 Yuri Babenko
 Mitch Babin
 John Baby
 Dave Babych
 Wayne Babych
 Jergus Baca
 Jason Bacashihua
 Ryan Bach
 Richard Bachman
 David Backes
 Johan Backlund
 Mikael Backlund
 Christian Backman
 Mike Backman
 Pete Backor
 Nicklas Backstrom
 Niklas Backstrom
 Ralph Backstrom
 Sven Baertschi
 Drew Bagnall
 Kevin Bahl
 Ace Bailey
 Bob Bailey
 Casey Bailey
 Garnet Bailey
 Josh Bailey
 Justin Bailey
 Reid Bailey
 Scott Bailey
 Joel Baillargeon
 Ken Baird
 Bill Baker
 Jamie Baker
 Steve Baker
 Peter Bakovic
 Chris Bala
 Jaroslav Balastik
 Rudolfs Balcers
 Helmuts Balderis
 Doug Baldwin
 Jozef Balej
 Mike Bales
 Earl Balfour
 Murray Balfour
 Terry Ball
 Keith Ballard
 Maxim Balmochnykh
 Dave Balon
 Bryon Baltimore
 Stan Baluik
 Carter Bancks
 Steve Bancroft
 Jeff Bandura
 Daniel Bang
 Frank Banham
 Darren Banks
 Murray Bannerman
 Drew Bannister
 Alexander Barabanov
 Ralph Barahona
 Ivan Baranka
 Ivan Barbashev
 Andy Barbe
 Bill Barber
 Don Barber
 Riley Barber
 Mark Barberio
 Cole Bardreau
 Bill Barilko
 Michal Barinka
 Cam Barker
 Doug Barkley
 Aleksander Barkov
 Bob Barlow
 Matthew Barnaby
 Blair Barnes
 Norm Barnes
 Stu Barnes
 Scott Barney
 Marco Baron
 Murray Baron
 Normand Baron
 Dave Barr
 Tom Barrasso
 Doug Barrault
 Alex Barre-Boulet
 Fred Barrett
 John Barrett
 Doug Barrie
 Len Barrie
 Tyson Barrie
 Morgan Barron
 Eddie Barry
 Marty Barry
 Ray Barry
 Lubos Bartecko
 Robin Bartel
 Matt Bartkowski
 Jim Bartlett
 Victor Bartley
 Cliff Barton
 Peter Bartos
 Milan Bartovic
 Oskars Bartulis
 Mathew Barzal
 Andrei Bashkirov
 Cody Bass
 Bob Bassen
 Hank Bassen
 Ryan Bast
 Nathan Bastian
 Baz Bastien
 Shawn Bates
 Frank Bathe
 Drake Batherson
 Andy Bathgate
 Frank Bathgate
 Bates Battaglia
 Jeff Batters
 Ruslan Batyrshin
 Bobby Bauer
 Garry Bauman
 Ken Baumgartner
 Nolan Baumgartner
 Bobby Baun
 Kyle Baun
 Sergei Bautin
 Robin Bawa
 Paul Baxter
 Ryan Bayda
 Gavin Bayreuther

Be

 Sandy Beadle
 Jay Beagle
 Jake Bean
 Ethan Bear
 Frank Beaton
 Jack Beattie
 Francois Beauchemin
 J. C. Beaudin
 Nicolas Beaudin
 Norm Beaudin
 Eric Beaudoin
 Serge Beaudoin
 Yves Beaudoin
 Mark Beaufait
 Nathan Beaulieu
 Don Beaupre
 Stephane Beauregard
 Anthony Beauvillier
 Barry Beck
 Taylor Beck
 Bob Beckett
 Chris Beckford-Tseu
 Jim Bedard (born 1927)
 Jim Bedard (born 1956)
 Clayton Beddoes
 Jaroslav Bednar
 John Bednarski
 Kris Beech
 Bob Beers
 Ed Beers
 Steve Begin
 Clarence Behling
 Marc Behrend
 Frank Beisler
 Derek Bekar
 Wade Belak
 Alain Belanger
 Eric Belanger
 Francis Belanger
 Jesse Belanger
 Ken Belanger
 Yves Belanger
 Roger Belanger
 Matt Beleskey
 Ed Belfour
 Michel Belhumeur
 Dan Belisle
 Jean Beliveau
 Billy Bell
 Brendan Bell
 Bruce Bell
 Gordie Bell
 Harry Bell
 Joe Bell
 Mark Bell
 Neil Belland
 Blake Bellefeuille
 Pete Bellefeuille
 Pierre-Edouard Bellemare
 Andy Bellemer
 Brett Bellemore
 Brian Bellows
 Kieffer Bellows
 Alex Belzile
 Emil Bemstrom
 Lin Bend
 Jan Benda
 Clint Benedict
 Jamie Benn
 Jordie Benn
 Adam Bennett
 Beau Bennett
 Bill Bennett
 Curt Bennett
 Frank Bennett
 Harvey Bennett Jr.
 Harvey Bennett Sr.
 Max Bennett
 Rick Bennett
 Sam Bennett
 Brian Benning
 Jim Benning
 Matt Benning
 Andre Benoit
 Joe Benoit
 Simon Benoit
 Bill Benson
 Bobby Benson
 Tyler Benson
 Sean Bentivoglio
 Doug Bentley
 Max Bentley
 Reg Bentley
 Ladislav Benysek
 Paul Beraldo
 Josef Beranek
 Bryan Berard
 Drake Berehowsky
 Red Berenson
 Andrew Berenzweig
 Perry Berezan
 Sergei Berezin
 Aki Berg
 Bill Berg
 Todd Bergen
 Sean Bergenheim
 Mike Berger
 Jean-Claude Bergeron
 Marc-Andre Bergeron
 Michel Bergeron
 Patrice Bergeron
 Yves Bergeron
 Marc Bergevin
 Niclas Bergfors
 Stefan Bergkvist
 Tim Bergland
 Bob Bergloff
 Bo Berglund
 Christian Berglund
 Patrik Berglund
 Gary Bergman
 Thommie Bergman
 Lean Bergmann
 Jonas Bergqvist
 Adam Berkhoel
 Louis Berlinguette
 Jacob Bernard-Docker
 Tim Bernhardt
 Jonathan Bernier
 Serge Bernier
 Steve Bernier
 Reto Berra
 Bob Berry
 Brad Berry
 Doug Berry
 Fred Berry
 Ken Berry
 Rick Berry
 Daniel Berthiaume
 Adam Berti
 Eric Bertrand
 Christoph Bertschy
 Todd Bertuzzi
 Tyler Bertuzzi
 Craig Berube
 Jean-Francois Berube
 Phil Bessler
 Pete Bessone
 Allan Bester
 John Bethel
 Karel Betik
 Maxim Bets
 Silvio Bettio
 Blair Betts
 Jeff Beukeboom
 Bill Beveridge
 Nick Beverley

Bi–Bl

 Dwight Bialowas
 Frank Bialowas
 Wayne Bianchin
 Antoine Bibeau
 Paul Bibeault
 Radim Bicanek
 Jiri Bicek
 Stu Bickel
 Bryan Bickell
 Todd Bidner
 Alex Biega
 Danny Biega
 Kevin Bieksa
 Zac Bierk
 Don Biggs
 Larry Bignell
 Chris Bigras
 Craig Billington
 Chad Billins
 Gilles Bilodeau
 Andre Binette
 Les Binkley
 Jordan Binnington
 Jack Bionda
 Martin Biron
 Mathieu Biron
 Sebastien Bisaillon
 Jake Bischoff
 Ben Bishop
 Clark Bishop
 Tom Bissett
 Paul Bissonnette
 Anthony Bitetto
 Dick Bittner
 Byron Bitz
 Anders Bjork
 Oliver Bjorkstrand
 Tobias Bjornfot
 Nick Bjugstad
 Scott Bjugstad
 James Black
 Steve Black
 Bob Blackburn
 Dan Blackburn
 Don Blackburn
 Jesse Blacker
 Colin Blackwell
 Mackenzie Blackwood
 Hank Blade
 Tom Bladon
 Garry Blaine
 Andy Blair
 Chuck Blair
 George "Dusty" Blair
 Sammy Blais
 Mike Blaisdell
 Bob Blake
 Hector "Toe" Blake
 Jason Blake
 Mickey Blake
 Mike Blake
 Rob Blake
 Nicolas Blanchard
 Joseph Blandisi
 Zdenek Blatny
 Anton Blidh
 Joachim Blichfeld
 Rick Blight
 Russ Blinco
 Mario Bliznak
 Ken Block
 Jeff Bloemberg
 Timo Blomqvist
 Arto Blomsten
 Mike Bloom
 Sylvain Blouin
 John Blue
 Teddy Blueger
 John Blum
 Jonathon Blum
 Mike Blunden

Bo

 Sergei Bobrovsky
 Brandon Bochenski
 Bob Bodak
 Gregg Boddy
 Doug Bodger
 Troy Bodie
 Gus Bodnar
 Andrew Bodnarchuk
 Mikkel Boedker
 Ron Boehm
 Garth Boesch
 Brock Boeser
 Zach Bogosian
 Eric Boguniecki
 Rick Boh
 Lonny Bohonos
 Alexandre Boikov
 Marc Boileau
 Patrick Boileau
 Rene Boileau
 Fred Boimistruck
 Gilles Boisvert
 Serge Boisvert
 Claude Boivin
 Leo Boivin
 Mike Boland (born 1954)
 Mike Boland (born 1949)
 Ivan Boldirev
 Alexandre Bolduc
 Dan Bolduc
 Michel Bolduc
 Matthew Boldy
 Frank "Buzz" Boll
 Jared Boll
 Dave Bolland
 Brandon Bollig
 Larry Bolonchuk
 Hugh Bolton
 Brad Bombardir
 Dan Bonar
 Peter Bondra
 Brian Bonin
 Marcel Bonin
 Nick Bonino
 Radek Bonk
 Ryan Bonni
 Jason Bonsignore
 Dennis Bonvie
 Jim Boo
 Derek Boogaard
 Buddy Boone
 David Booth
 George Boothman
 Adam Boqvist
 Jesper Boqvist
 Chris Bordeleau
 J. P. Bordeleau
 Patrick Bordeleau
 Paulin Bordeleau
 Sebastien Bordeleau
 Casey Borer
 William Borgen
 Andreas Borgman
 Henrik Borgstrom
 Jack Borotsik
 Mark Borowiecki
 Luciano Borsato
 Nikolai Borschevsky
 Robert Bortuzzo
 Laurie Boschman
 Mike Bossy
 Helge "Bulge" Bostrom
 Mark Botell
 Tim Bothwell
 Jason Botterill
 Cam Botting
 Henry Boucha
 Dan Bouchard
 Dick Bouchard
 Edmond Bouchard
 Emile Bouchard
 Evan Bouchard
 Joel Bouchard
 Pierre Bouchard
 Pierre-Marc Bouchard
 Bill Boucher
 Brian Boucher
 Clarence Boucher
 Frank Boucher
 George Boucher
 Philippe Boucher
 Reid Boucher
 Robert Boucher
 Tyler Bouck
 Bruce Boudreau
 Andre Boudrias
 Barry Boughner
 Bob Boughner
 Francis Bouillon
 Jesse Boulerice
 Eric Boulton
 Lance Bouma
 Josef Boumedienne
 Dan Bourbonnais
 Rick Bourbonnais
 Conrad Bourcier
 Jean Bourcier
 Fred Bourdginon
 Luc Bourdon
 Marc-Andre Bourdon
 Leo Bourgeault
 Charlie Bourgeois
 Bob Bourne
 Michael Bournival
 Chris Bourque
 Claude Bourque
 Gabriel Bourque
 Phil Bourque
 Ray Bourque
 Rene Bourque
 Ryan Bourque
 Pat Boutette
 Paul Boutilier
 Rollie Boutin
 Lionel Bouvrette
 Jay Bouwmeester
 Landon Bow
 Jason Bowen
 Johnny Bower
 Madison Bowey
 Bill Bowler
 Drayson Bowman
 Kirk Bowman
 Ralph "Scotty" Bowman
 Jack Bownass
 Rick Bowness
 Darryl Boyce
 Johnny Boychuk
 Zach Boychuk
 Billy Boyd
 Dustin Boyd
 Irwin Boyd
 Randy Boyd
 Travis Boyd
 Wally Boyer
 Zac Boyer
 Brad Boyes
 Darren Boyko
 Brian Boyle
 Dan Boyle
 Kevin Boyle
 Nick Boynton
 Tyler Bozak
 Steve Bozek
 Philippe Bozon

Br

 John Brackenborough
 Curt Brackenbury
 Barton Bradley
 Brian Bradley
 Lyle Bradley
 Matt Bradley
 Neil Brady
 Rick Bragnalo
 Andy Branigan
 Erik Brannstrom
 Per-Olov Brasar
 Donald Brashear
 Derick Brassard
 Fred Brathwaite
 Jesper Bratt
 Justin Braun
 Russ "Buster" Brayshaw
 Frank Breault
 Chris Breen
 Ken Breitenbach
 Pavel Brendl
 Dan Brennan
 Doug Brennan
 Kip Brennan
 Rich Brennan
 T. J. Brennan
 Tom Brennan
 John Brenneman
 Tim Brent
 Joe Bretto
 Carl Brewer
 Eric Brewer
 Andy Brickley
 Connor Brickley
 Daniel Brickley
 Archie Briden
 Mel Bridgman
 Daniel Briere
 Michel Briere
 Travis Brigley
 Aris Brimanis
 Frank Brimsek
 Rod Brind'Amour
 Doug Brindley
 David Brine
 Milton Brink
 Guillaume Brisebois
 Patrice Brisebois
 Gerry Brisson
 Greg Britz
 Harry "Punch" Broadbent
 Alex Broadhurst
 Martin Brochu
 Stephane Brochu
 Walter "Turk" Broda
 Connie Broden
 Ken Broderick
 Len Broderick
 Martin Brodeur
 Mike Brodeur
 Richard Brodeur
 T. J. Brodie
 Jonas Brodin
 Kyle Brodziak
 Jonny Brodzinski
 David Broll
 Mathias Brome
 Gary Bromley
 Sheldon Brookbank
 Wade Brookbank
 Bob Brooke
 Adam Brooks
 Alex Brooks
 Arthur Brooks
 Gord Brooks
 Ross Brooks
 Evan Brophey
 Bernie Brophy
 Frank Brophy
 Willie Brossart
 Laurent Brossoit
 Aaron Broten
 Neal Broten
 Paul Broten
 Julien Brouillette
 Paul Brousseau
 Troy Brouwer
 Adam Brown
 Andy Brown
 Arnie Brown
 Brad Brown
 Cam Brown
 Chris Brown
 Connie Brown
 Connor Brown
 Curtis Brown
 Dave Brown
 Doug Brown
 Dustin Brown
 Fred Brown
 George Brown
 Gerry Brown
 Greg Brown
 Harold Brown
 J. T. Brown
 Jeff Brown
 Jim Brown
 Josh Brown
 Keith Brown
 Ken Brown
 Kevin Brown
 Larry Brown
 Logan Brown
 Mike Brown (born 1979)
 Mike Brown (born 1985)
 Patrick Brown
 Rob Brown
 Sean Brown
 Stan Brown
 Wayne "Weiner" Brown
 Cecil Browne
 Jack Brownschidle
 Jeff Brownschidle
 Jeff Brubaker
 David Bruce
 Gordon Bruce
 Morley Bruce
 Gilbert Brule
 Steve Brule
 Murray Brumwell
 Damien Brunner
 Fabian Brunnstrom
 Benoit Brunet
 Ed Bruneteau
 Modere "Mud" Bruneteau
 Mario Brunetta
 Andrew Brunette
 Bill Brydge
 Paul Brydges
 Glen Brydson
 Gord Brydson
 Sergei Brylin
 Jacob Bryson
 Ilya Bryzgalov

Bu

 Jiri Bubla
 Al Buchanan
 Jeff Buchanan
 Mike Buchanan
 Ralph "Bucky" Buchanan
 Ron Buchanan
 Kelly Buchberger
 Pavel Buchnevich
 Johnny Bucyk
 Randy Bucyk
 Peter Budaj
 Doug Buhr
 Tony Bukovich
 Jan Bulis
 Mike Bullard
 Hy Buller
 Ted Bulley
 Bruce Bullock
 Brett Bulmer
 Connor Bunnaman
 Michael Bunting
 Tyler Bunz
 Andre Burakovsky
 Robert Burakovsky
 Billy Burch
 Fred "Skippy" Burchell
 Glen Burdon
 Pavel Bure
 Valeri Bure
 Marc Bureau
 Bill Burega
 Erik Burgdoerfer
 Adam Burish
 Eddie Burke
 Marty Burke
 Sean Burke
 Roy Burmister
 Alexander Burmistrov
 Kelly Burnett
 Bobby Burns
 Brent Burns
 Charlie Burns
 Gary Burns
 Norm Burns
 Robin Burns
 Shawn Burr
 Randy Burridge
 Kyle Burroughs
 Alex Burrows
 Dave Burrows
 Burt Burry
 Adam Burt
 Cummy Burton
 Nelson Burton
 Eddie Bush
 Rod Buskas
 Mike Busniuk
 Ron Busniuk
 Walter Buswell
 Garth Butcher
 Will Butcher
 Sven Butenschon
 Bobby Butler
 Chris Butler
 Dick Butler
 Jerry Butler
 Vyacheslav Butsayev
 Yuri Butsayev
 Bill Butters
 Gordon Buttrey
 Gordon Buynak
 Petr Buzek
 Stephen Buzinski

By

 Ilya Byakin
 John Byce
 Dane Byers
 Gordie Byers
 Jerry Byers
 Lyndon Byers
 Mike Byers
 Quinton Byfield
 Dustin Byfuglien
 Dmitry Bykov
 Dan Bylsma
 Bowen Byram
 Shawn Byram
 Paul Byron

See also
 hockeydb.com NHL Player List - B

Players